The Director of Education was a position in the Hong Kong Government. The officeholder headed the former Education Department.

History
As a result of restructuring in 1983, the old Education Department was reorganised into the Education and Manpower Branch and the Education Department. The old position of Director of Education was, accordingly, split into the Secretary for Education and Manpower and Director of Education, with the latter reporting to the former. 

Before 1983, the Director of Education may be appointed by the Governor as ex-officio member of the Legislative Council. After 1983 and before 1991, it would be the Secretary for Education and Manpower to serve in the Legislative Council.

The position was abolished in 2003. The functions of the Director of Education were transferred to the Permanent Secretary for Education in 2003, following the passage of the Education Reorganization (Miscellaneous Amendments) Bill 2002 in the Legislative Council.

Trivia

Before its abolishment in 2003, the position was considered a stepping stone to secretary-level positions (permanent secretary-level after 2002), since the Director of Education was among the only two D7 positions according to the Civil Service Directorate Pay Scale, whereas the secretaries are D8 positions.

List of office holders
Colvyn Hugh Haye (1980 – 1984)
Leung Man-kin (1984 – 1987)
Li Yuet-ting (1987 – 1992)
Dominic Wong (1992 – 1994)
Lam Woon-kwong (1994 – 1996)
Helen Yu (1996 – 1998)
Fanny Law (November 1998 – June 2000)
Matthew Cheung (2000 – July 2002)
Lee Hing Fai (acting) 2002 – 1 January 2003

References

Education in Hong Kong